Liješće may refer to:

In Bosnia and Herzegovina:
 Liješće (Brod)
 Liješće (Srebrenica)

In Croatia:
 Liješće (Ozalj)

See also 
 Malo Lešče